The women's javelin throw at the 2018 European Athletics Championships took place at the Olympic Stadium on 9 and 10 August.

Records

Schedule

Results

Qualification
Qualification: 60.50 m (Q) or best 12 performers (q )

Final

References

javelin throw W
Javelin throw at the European Athletics Championships
Euro